Dødens Triumf is an album by The Savage Rose from 1972, released on Polydor and the music for the ballet of the same name by Flemming Flindt after Eugène Ionesco play Jeux de massacre.

Track listing
"Byen Vågner" (The City Awakes) - 6:32
"De Unge Elskende" (The Young Lovers) - 6:36
"Borgerens Død" (Death of the Citizen) - 3:27
"De To Gamle" (The Two Old) - 4:10
"Bruden Pyntes" (Dressing of the Bride) - 4:02
"Bryllup" (Wedding) - 3:26
"Soldaternes Død" (Death of the Soldiers) - 1:48
"Den Døde By - Modebutikken Plyndres" (The Dead City/Fashion Shop Robbery) - 7:14
"Dear Little Mother"  - 4:53

Personnel 
 Annisette - Vocals
 Alex Riel – Drums, Percussion
 Ole Molin – Guitar
 Rudolf Hansen – Guitar, Bass
 Anders Koppel – Organ, Harmonica, Flute, Percussion 
 Thomas Koppel – Piano, Harmonium, Percussion

References

External links 

1972 albums
The Savage Rose albums